The discography of American hardcore hip hop group Onyx consist of 9 studio albums, 1 collaborative album, 1 EP, 8 compilation albums, 22 soundtracks and 60 singles. Eight singles of the group were in the top ten of the Billboard charts. The group is best known for their platinum-certified hit "Slam".

Albums

Studio albums

Collaborative albums

Compilation albums

Soundtrack albums
 August 21, 1993: Strapped
 September 14, 1993: Judgment Night
 October 14, 1993: Beavis and Butt-Head ("Buff 'N' Stuff")
 March 18, 1994: Beavis and Butt-Head ("Rabies Scare")
 April 6, 1995: The Addiction
 August 15, 1995: The Show
 April 23, 1996: Sunset Park
 February 17, 1998: Ride (Music From The Dimension Motion Picture)
 December 21, 2001: How High
 October 29, 2002: 8 Mile
 March 18, 2003: The Shield
 October 24, 2005: Grand Theft Auto: Liberty City Stories
 July 14, 2009: A Day in the Life
 June 19, 2015: Dope
 December 13, 2015: Brooklyn Nine-Nine
 August 5, 2016: The Tonight Show Starring Jimmy Fallon
 December 17, 2016: Why Him?
 June 7, 2016: Never Back Down: No Surrender
 February 16, 2017: Fist Fight
 June 23, 2017: Silicon Valley (Music from the HBO Original Series)
 May 24, 2020: Tiger Slam
 August 14, 2020: Ted Lasso ("Biscuits")

EPs

Singles

Guest appearances
1993: "Livin' Loc'd" by Bo$$ (feat. Onyx) from Bo$$ Born Gangstaz
1993: "A Blind Date With Boss" by Bo$$ (feat. Onyx) from Bo$$ Born Gangstaz
1993: "Get Open" by Run-D.M.C. (feat. Onyx) from Run-D.M.C. Down With The King
1993: "Three Little Indians" by Run-D.M.C. (feat. Onyx) from Run-D.M.C. Down With The King
1995: "I'll Murder You Remix" by Gang Green (feat. Onyx) from Gang Green I'll Murder You - Single
1997: "Santa Baby" by Rev. Run (feat. Mase, Diddy, Snoop Dogg, Salt-N-Pepa, Onyx & Keith Murray) from Various Artists A Very Special Christmas 3
1998: "Xtreme" by All City (feat. Onyx) from All City Metropolis Gold
1999: "Roc-In-It" by Deejay Punk-Roc (feat. Onyx) from Deejay Punk-Roc Deejay Punk-Roc vs. Onyx – Roc-In-It
1999: "NY, NY" by Ice-T (feat. Onyx) from Ice-T The Seventh Deadly Sin
2001: "Shut 'Em Down 2001" by Stone Rivers (feat. Sticky Fingaz, Fredro Starr) from Stone Rivers All My Life
2002: "Go Hard (Remix)" by Made Men (feat. Onyx, Cadillac Tah & Black Child, Kurupt, Crooked I & Eastwood) from Made Men Rebirth Of The West Coast EP
2003: "Flatdafuccout" by Vishiss (feat. Fredro Starr & Sticky Fingaz)
2003: "Last Days Reloaded" by Dead Prez (feat. Onyx) from Dead Prez Turn Off The Radio: The Mixtape Vol. 2-Get Free Or Die Tryin'''
2005: "Don't Go" by Darryl Riley (feat. Onyx & Henesseys) from Darryl Riley Man On Fire2009: "International Thug" by Mal Da Udal (feat. Onyx) from Mal Da Udal International Thug2009: "International Thug" by Mal Da Udal (feat. Onyx) (Thug Version) from Mal Da Udal International Thug2009: "Vodka Rap" by Mal Da Udal (feat. Fredro Starr, B-Reign & Partymaker_Stef) from Mal Da Udal International Thug2010: "Say What" by Mal Da Udal (feat. Onyx & Dzham) from Mal Da Udal Рэп не ради денег2010: "Vrijeme je" by Nered & Stoka (feat. Onyx)
2010: "Запоминай" by ZB (feat. Onyx, Soprano, TK) from ZB Авородз2011: "Arretez Les Tchatches" by Storm B (feat. Onyx)
2011: "Bringin' Bac Da Madface" by Annakin Slayd (feat. Fredro Starr & Sticky Fingaz of Onyx) from Annakin Slayd Once More We Survive2011: "Get 'Em!" by Deep Frost (feat. Onyx & MC Profound)
2011: "Ready For War" by Soulkast (feat. Onyx & Brahi) from Soulkast Honoris Causa2011: "Corner Store Hip-Hop" by SYDAFX (feat. Onyx)
2012: "Classic Hardcore (feat. Onyx) by Babo (feat. Onyx) from Babo Legends never die2012: "Vandalize Shit" by Snak The Ripper (feat. Onyx) from Snak The Ripper White Dynamite2012: "Dogz" by Agallah (feat. Onyx)
2012: "Bloodsport" by Duke Montana (feat. Onyx) from Duke Montana Stay Gold2012: "45 Game" by Monstar361 & Massaka (feat. Onyx) from Monstar361 & Massaka Blutbeton 22012: "Colabo" by Slums Attack (feat. Onyx & TEWU) from Slums Attack CNO22012: "Sweet Nothing" by So Sick Social Club (feat. Onyx & Jason Rockman of Slaves On Dope) from So Sick Social Club Dead Friends Don't Tell2012: "My Purpose" by Young Noble (feat. Onyx & E.D.I.) from Young Noble Outlaw Rydahz, Vol. 12013: "Yasanan Dram" by Onder Sahin & Rahmi Polat a.k.a. Babo (feat. Onyx & Ceza & Crak) 
2013: "Fuck Out My Face" by ASAP Ferg (feat. B-Real, Onyx & Aston Matthews) from ASAP Ferg Trap Lord2013: "Unite 2 United" by Click Click Boom (feat. Onyx) from Click Click Boom Click Click Boom2013: "Panic Room" by Dope D.O.D. (feat. Onyx) from Dope D.O.D. Da Roach2013: "Small World" by Krazy K (feat. Onyx) from Krazy K Small World2013: "We Get Live" by Myster DL (feat. Onyx) from Myster DL We Get Live2013: "Do U Bac Down" by Snowgoons (feat. Onyx) from Snowgoons Black Snow 22014: "Represent" by N'Pans (feat. Onyx) from N'Pans Aktsent2014: "Represent" (Portuguese - Creole version) by N'Pans (feat. Onyx) from N'Pans Aktsent2014: "My Brother's Keeper" by DJ Kay Slay (feat. The Outlawz, Onyx) from DJ Kay Slay The Last Hip Hop Disciple (Mixtape)2014: "Schocktherapie" by Best.E (feat. Satan & Onyx) from Best.E Der Blaue Reiter2014: "Schocktherapie" (Remix) by Best.E (feat. Satan & Onyx)
2014: "Mayday" by Dirrty D & Morsdood (feat. Onyx)
2014: "Get Up" by DJ Jean Maron (feat. Onyx) from DJ Jean Maron True School2014: "Coming for You" by Ryzhun (feat. Onyx)
2014: "Bazdmeg" by Killakikitt (feat. Onyx) from Killakikitt KillaGoons2014: "Madd Rush" by OptiMystic (feat. Onyx & JR.) from OptiMystic Day Of The Guiding Light2015: "Fight" by Лигалайз (feat. Onyx) from Лигалайз Fight - Single2015: "Nobody Move" by MoSS (feat. Onyx & Havoc) from MoSS Marching to the Sound of My Own Drum2015: "Las Calles Me Lo Exigen" by Tankeone (feat. Onyx) from Tankeone Las Calles Me Lo Exigen - Single2016: "Downward Spiral" by Ras Kass (feat. Freddie Foxxx & Onyx) from Ras Kass Intellectual Property: SOI22016: "E.A.T." by Ali Vegas (feat. Onyx & a Dash) from Ali Vegas Just Let Me Rhyme2016: "Give It Up" by Рем Дигга (feat. Onyx) from Рем Дигга 42/372016: "Freestyle" by Sam The Sleezbag & DJ Mekalek (feat. Onyx, Bishop Brigante) from Sam The Sleezbag & DJ Mekalek #SleezbagMekalekTape2017: "Slam Wieder" by Eko Fresh (feat. Samy Deluxe, Afrob & Onxy) from Eko Fresh König von Deutschland2017: "Hardcore Rap" by Klee Magor (feat. Onyx) from Klee Magor Hardcore Rap (feat. ONYX) - Single2017: "900" by Onyx, H16 & DMS
2017: "100 Mad Vets" by N.B.S. (feat. Onyx) from N.B.S. 100 Mad Vets - Single2018: "Where They At" by N.B.S. (feat. Onyx) from N.B.S. SwissVets 22018: "Heat" by Suspect (feat. Onyx) from Suspect Razorblade Music2018: "Out for Blood" by Armada the Producer (feat. Onyx, Kali Ranks) from Armada the Producer The Formula - EP2018: "Uliczna Autonomia 2" by Street Autonomy (feat. Onyx) from Street Autonomy Uliczna Autonomia2018: "Turn The Volume Up" by N.B.S. (feat. Onyx) from N.B.S. Lost In Budapest2018: "Make It Count" by Larceny (feat. Onyx) from Larceny Make It Count2018: "Represent" (Remix) by N'Pans (feat. Onyx) from N'Pans Легенда2019: "Murda" by Marso & Bobkata (feat. Onyx)
 2020: «Whats Up» by Lords of the Underground (feat. Onyx) from Lords of the Underground So Legendary 2020: «6 Feet» by Crack Brodas (feat. Onyx) from Crack Brodas 6 Feet - Single 2020: «Golden Era» by Yumalesra (feat. Onyx) from Yumalesra Golden Era (feat. Onyx) - Single 2020: «B******t» by Sick Boy Simon & Dirty Dagoes (feat. Onyx) from Sick Boy Simon & Dirty Dagoes B******t (feat. Onyx) - Single 2020: «We Made It Up» by Iceman (feat. Onyx) from Iceman We Made It Up - Single 2023: «Traversée Solitaire» by Coeff feat. Hit l'Agité (feat. Onyx) from COEFF Traversée Solitaire - Single''

Music videos
1992: "Throw Ya Gunz" | Directed by Diane Martel
1992: "Bacdafucup" | Directed by Steve Carr
1993: "Slam" | Directed by Parris Mayhew
1993: "Da Nex Niguz" | Directed by Brett Ratner
1993: "Shifftee" | Directed by Parris Mayhew
1993: "Slam" (Bionyx Remix) (feat. Biohazard) | Directed by Parris Mayhew
1993: "Judgment Night" (feat. Biohazard) | Directed by David Perez Shadi
1995: "All We Got Iz Us" | Directed by Joseph Kahn
1995: "Last Dayz" | Directed by Joseph Kahn
1995: "I'll Murder You" (feat. Gang Green) | Directed by Zodiac Fishgrease 
1995: "Live Niguz" | Directed by Diane Martel
1995: "Walk In New York" | Directed by Zodiac Fishgrease
1998: "Shut 'Em Down" (feat. DMX) | Directed by Gregory Dark
1998: "The Worst" (feat. Wu-Tang Clan) | Directed by Diane Martel
1998: "React" (feat. Still Livin', X1 & 50 Cent) | Directed by Little X
1998: "Broke Willies" | Directed by Little X
2002: "Slam Harder" | Directed by Zodiac Fishgrease
2008: "Neva Goin' Bac" | Directed by Russell Harvin & Fredro Starr
2009: "Money In The Sky" (feat. Soprano Da Great)
2009: "Black Rock (U Know Wht It Iz)" | Directed by Jeffrey Elmont
2009: "The Real Black Rock" (Dame Dash Diss W- Jay-Z Soundalike Voice-overs) | Directed by Jeffrey Elmont
2010: "Black Hoodie Rap" (feat. MakemPay) | Directed by Sticky Fingaz
2011: "Classic Terror" | Directed by Sticky Fingaz
2011: "I'm So 90's" | Directed by Brazil
2011: "Mad Energy" | Directed by Sticky Fingaz
2011: "We On That" (feat. Young Kazh) | Directed by Big Shot Music INC.
2011: "Wut U Gonna Do" | Directed by Myster DL
2011: "Hammers On Deck" | Directed by Myster DL
2011: "You Ain't Ready For Me" | Directed by Big Shot Music INC.
2012: "2012" (feat. Myster DL) | Directed by Myster DL
2012: "2012" (Russian version) | Directed by Ярослав Кардэлло и Артем Стряпан
2012: "Belly Of The Beast" | Directed by Kevin KJ Johnson
2014: "#WakeDaFucUp" (feat. Dope D.O.D.) | Directed by Home Run
2014: "Whut Whut" | Directed by Big Shot Music INC.
2014: "Buc Bac" | Directed by DJ Illegal; Filmed by Gigo Flow; Edited by SirQlate
2014: "Hammers On Deck" | Directed by Brian De Palma
2014: "TurnDaFucUp" | Directed by Rome York & Trash Secco
2014: "The Realest" | Directed by Big Shot Music INC.
2015: "Against All Authorities" | Directed by Rome York
2015: "Fuck Da Law" | Directed by Rome York
2016: "#WakeDaFucUp Reloaded" (feat. Dope D.O.D.) | Directed by Home Run
2016: "BOOM!!" | Directed by Eyes Jacking
2016: "Slam" (Devil s Domain movie) | Directed by Jared Cohn
2017: "Hustlin Hours" | Directed by DJ Illegal
2017: "XXX" by Onyx & Dope D.O.D. | Directed and edited by Andres Fouche
2017: "Piro" by Onyx & Dope D.O.D. | Animation by Martijn Bosgraaf, Ricardo Gómez & Lars Kiewiet
2017: "Don't Sleep" by Onyx & Dope D.O.D. | Directed and edited by Andres Fouche
2018: "Black Rock" | Directed by Vicente Cordero
2019: "Ain't No Time To Rest" (feat. Dope D.O.D.) | Directed by Gigo Flow
2019: "Kill Da Mic" | Directed by Rok Kadoic
2019: "Monsters Gorillas" | Directed by ShotByDon
2020: "Hoodies Down" | Directed by Gigo Flow & DJ Illegal
 2021: "Coming Outside" | Directed by Vicente Cordero / Industrialism Films
 2021: "Ahh Yeah" | Directed by Vicente Cordero / Industrialism Films

References

External links
 Onyx at Discogs

Discographies of American artists
Hip hop discographies